Move Records is an Australian record label that was started in 1968 by Martin Wright. It concentrates primarily in classical and jazz music, particularly Australian, and most frequently Melbourne-based musicians and composers.

Artists 

Composers include Julian Yu, George Dreyfus, John Sangster, Eve Duncan, Percy Grainger, Mark Clement Pollard, Brenton Broadstock, Tony Gould, Peter Sculthorpe, Cezary Skubiszewski, David Joseph, Marshall-Hall, Nigel Westlake, Carl Vine, David Chisholm (composer), Larry Sitsky, Kanako Okamoto, Andrew Ford, Andrew Byrne, Thomas Reiner (composer), Christian Heim  and others.

Classical artists include Michael Kieran Harvey, Douglas Lawrence, Elizabeth Anderson, John O'Donnell, Jocqueline Ogiel, La Romanesca, Robert Ampt, Gerald English, Genevieve Lacey, Peter Carroll-Held, Ian Holtham, Miwako Abe, Ronald Farren-Price, Ian King, Sonny Chua, re-sound, Amy Johansen, Norman Kaye, Collusion and others.

Jazz artists include Tony Gould, Bob Sedergreen, Keith Hounslow, John Sangster, Emma Gilmartin, Ted Vining, the Alan Lee/Jo Abbott Quartet, Debra Blaquiere, and others.

Soundtracks 
The label has also released soundtracks of Australian films; the best known is Japanese Story. Ambient and World Music artists include Dean Frenkel, Le Tuan Hung and Ros Bandt. The label has specialised in recording classical pipe organs, many of which have great historical interest. These have included the bamboo organ in Manila, the Sydney Opera House organ, Melbourne and Sydney Town Hall organs, and many smaller instruments from the German-settled Barossa Valley in South Australia, and gold-rush Ballarat area of Victoria.

See also 

 List of record labels

References

External links
 

Australian independent record labels
Record labels established in 1968
Classical music record labels
1968 establishments in Australia